Kay Morley may refer to:

 Kay Morley-Brown (born 1963), British hurdler
 Kay Morley (actress) (1920–2020), American actress